Aleksander Ciążyński (30 April 1945 – 11 November 2021) was a Polish field hockey player. He competed in the men's tournament at the 1972 Summer Olympics. He died on 11 November 2021, at the age of 76.

References

External links
 

1945 births
2021 deaths
Polish male field hockey players
Olympic field hockey players of Poland
Field hockey players at the 1972 Summer Olympics
People from Gniezno